Q-Tee Spy is the second mini-album from the Japanese punk rock band 54 Nude Honeys, released on May 5, 1996, by Epic Sony/dohb Discs.

Track listing

References

1996 EPs
54 Nude Honeys albums